Pat McCormack (born 8 June 1995) is a British boxer who is affiliated with Birtley ABC. He is the 2018 69 kg Commonwealth Games Gold Medalist. He also competed in the men's light welterweight event at the 2016 Summer Olympics.

In 2019, McCormack was selected to compete at the European Games in Minsk, Belarus. He also competed at the World Championships in Yekaterinburg, Russia, where he won the silver medal after losing by split decision (4:0) to Andrey Zamkovoy in the final.

In 2021, McCormack qualified for the 2020 Summer Olympics, going in as the No 1 seed and for many insiders he was viewed as the favourite to win the gold due to his stellar performances in previous competitions, McCormack made it to the final losing out to previous gold medallist Roniel Iglesias taking home a Silver Medal

He is the twin brother of fellow boxer Luke McCormack.

References

External links
 
 
 
 
 

1995 births
Living people
British male boxers
English male boxers
Welterweight boxers
Olympic boxers of Great Britain
Olympic silver medallists for Great Britain
Olympic medalists in boxing
Boxers at the 2016 Summer Olympics
Boxers at the 2020 Summer Olympics
Medalists at the 2020 Summer Olympics
Commonwealth Games medallists in boxing
Commonwealth Games gold medallists for England
Boxers at the 2018 Commonwealth Games
European Games medalists in boxing
European Games gold medalists for Great Britain
Boxers at the 2019 European Games
AIBA World Boxing Championships medalists
Sportspeople from Sunderland
Medallists at the 2018 Commonwealth Games